Crossbar may refer to:

Structures 
 Latch (hardware), a post barring a door
 Top tube of a bicycle frame
 Crossbar, the horizontal member of various sports goals
 Crossbar, a horizontal member of an electricity pylon

Other 
 In electronics, crossbar switch, a switch connecting multiple inputs to multiple outputs in a matrix manner
 In typeface anatomy, crossbar refers to some types of horizontal strokes
 Crossbar (computer hardware manufacturer), a company manufacturing resistive random-access memory
 Crossbar (film), a 1979 Canadian television film